The 1996 Copa del Rey Final was the 94th final of the Spanish cup competition, the Copa del Rey. The final was played at La Romareda Stadium in Zaragoza on 10 April 1996. The match was won by Atlético Madrid, who beat Barcelona 1–0, meaning Atlético completed the domestic double.

Details

1996
Copa del Rey
FC Barcelona matches
Atlético Madrid matches